Kwek Leng Beng (born 1941) is a Singaporean billionaire businessman. He is the executive chairman of Hong Leong Group Singapore. In September 2019, Forbes estimated his net worth to be US$3.4 billion.

Early life
Kwek's father, the late Kwek Hong Png left Tongan, Fujian province, China as a penniless teenager for Singapore and subsequently founded the Hong Leong group there. Kwek Leng Beng was trained as lawyer in London, but chose to join the family business in the early 1960s.

Career
He became chairman in 1990 and went on to establish an international reputation for his leadership of the Hong Leong Group, which is now a conglomerate with more than 300 companies, including 12 listed ones.

Kwek is the chairman of City Developments Limited (CDL), an international property and hotel conglomerate and the leading real estate developer in Singapore. It operates in 20 countries in Asia, Europe, North America and Australasia. CDL has over 250 subsidiaries and associated companies including 8 companies listed on the stock exchanges of Singapore, London, Hong Kong, Amsterdam, New Zealand and Manila. CDL has a market capitalization of US$5.8 billion and ranks just outside Singapore's top 10 listed companies. It is also the second-biggest property developer in Southeast Asia.

Kwek chairs Millennium & Copthorne (M&C) Hotels, a London-listed international hotel group of which a 53% share belongs to CDL. M&C is ranked 40th among the world's top international hotel groups and has a portfolio of over 120 owned and managed hotels with about 36,500 rooms in 19 countries (including those in the pipeline).

Kwek's Hong Leong Group also owns Hong Leong Finance, Singapore's largest finance company, with a network of 28 branch offices. Kwek is a member of the board of trustees of the Singapore Management University. He received an honorary doctorate from Oxford Brookes University. Kwek oversees the Singaporean operations of the Hong Leong Group, while his cousin and fellow billionaire Quek Leng Chan oversees the Malaysian.

Private life
Kwek is married to Cecilia Kok. The couple's son Sherman is CDL's CEO since January 2018. His younger son Kingston was a private investor in the equity and debt markets who became a venture capitalist.

References

External links
 Hong Leong Group Singapore

Hokkien businesspeople
Singaporean businesspeople
Singaporean people of Hokkien descent
Living people
Singaporean billionaires
1941 births
Singaporean chairpersons of corporations